"To Be a Lover" is a song written by William Bell and Booker T. Jones originally as "I Forgot to Be Your Lover", but best known as a cover by Billy Idol on his 1986 album Whiplash Smile. As the album's lead single, it became Idol's second top ten hit in the US, peaking at No. 6 on the Billboard Hot 100 and No. 22 on the UK Singles Chart.

William Bell recording
The song was written by William Bell and Booker T. Jones, and originally performed by Bell as a soul ballad titled "I Forgot to Be Your Lover". It was released in late 1968 and hitting No. 45 on the Hot 100 and No. 10 on Billboard′s Hot Rhythm & Blues Singles chart in early 1969.  This version has since been sampled by Ludacris on his song "Growing Pains" from Word of Mouf (2001), by Jaheim on "Put That Woman First" from Still Ghetto (2002) and by Dilated Peoples on the song "Worst Comes to Worst".

Other soul interpretations
The Mad Lads released a lush orchestral soul version of the song on their 1973 album A New Beginning, also released by Stax/Volt.

Reggae versions
In 1971, Lee "Scratch" Perry produced an early reggae version of the song, performed in an uptempo style by Shenley Duffus with Perry's studio band the Upsetters, with the title shortened to "To Be a Lover".  In 1977, Perry again produced the song, this time for George Faith. This version, also called simply "To Be a Lover", was heavily shaped by Perry's Black Ark sound and effects and featured backing vocals from the Meditations and Mighty Diamonds. It appeared on Faith's album Super Eight, which was released as To Be a Lover in the UK.

Billy Idol version

In 1986, the track was reworked and became the second high-profile cover song Billy Idol released as a single, after 1981's "Mony Mony". Billy Idol was introduced to the song by the George Faith reggae version—he initially was unaware of the original William Bell release, and so retained the truncated title "To Be a Lover".  He more radically transformed the song, adding a more rockabilly feel and danceable beat to its soulful underpinnings.

The single was backed by Whiplash Smile album track "All Summer Single". Two different 12″ singles were also released worldwide (one in the UK and one in Australia), featuring the aforementioned track and two extended remixes of "To Be a Lover (Mother of Mercy Mix)" (6:45) and "Rock 'n' Roll Mix" (Australia and New Zealand only). The "Mother of Mercy Mix" differs quite significantly from the single version; it is a harder sounding song, with a prominent heavy guitar riff by Steve Stevens dominating most of the track and an interlude with distorted female groans. It is this version that is featured on the 1987 US and 1988 Japan editions of the remix compilation album Vital Idol. The UK 12″ was also released as a limited-edition picture disc.

Billboard called it a "foot-twitching disco/rockabilly fusion."  Cash Box said it's "full of...bad boy sexiness."

Formats and track listings

7″: Chrysalis - IDOL 8 (UK)
"To Be a Lover" – 3:50
"All Summer Single" – 4:33

12″: Chrysalis - IDOLX 8 (UK)
"To Be a Lover (Mother of Mercy Mix)" – 6:45
"To Be a Lover" – 3:50
"All Summer Single" – 4:33

 Also available as a picture disc (IDOLP 8)

12″: Festival Records - X 14449 (Australia and New Zealand)
"To Be a Lover (Rock 'n' Roll Mix)" – 7:11
"To Be a Lover (Mother of Mercy Mix)" – 6:45
"All Summer Single" – 4:33

Charts

Weekly charts

Year-end charts

Bruce Springsteen version
Bruce Springsteen recorded the song for his 2022 album, Only the Strong Survive.

Notes

References

1968 songs
1968 singles
1977 singles
1986 singles
Billy Idol songs
Chrysalis Records singles
Songs written by Booker T. Jones
Songs written by William Bell (singer)
Festival Records singles